Sweet viburnum is a common name for several plants and may refer to:

Viburnum lentago, native to North America
Viburnum odoratissimum, native to Asia